Effective atomic number, denoted by Zeff, may refer to:

 Effective nuclear charge of an individual atom, as felt by electrons within that atom
 Effective atomic number (compounds and mixtures) of a composite material